Hasheminejad Airport Metro Station is a station of Mashhad Metro Line 1. The station serves as an access point to Mashhad Shahid Hasheminejad International Airport and provides an indoor connection to the airport terminal. The station building is located adjacent to the airport terminal.

References

Mashhad Metro stations
Railway stations opened in 2011
2011 establishments in Iran